Qualys, Inc. is an American technology firm based in Foster City, California, specializing in cloud security, compliance and related services and is based in Foster City, California. 

Qualys has over 10,300 customers in more than 130 countries, including a majority of the Forbes Global 100. The company has strategic partnerships with major managed services providers and consulting organizations including BT, Dell SecureWorks, Fujitsu, IBM, NTT, Symantec, Verizon, and Wipro.

History
Qualys has been described as "one of the earliest software-as-a-service security vendors."

Philippe Courtot first invested in the company in 1999. He became CEO and board chair in 2001. In the announcement of the second round of financing, Courtot described Qualys as addressing a "mounting need for automatic detection of network vulnerabilities."

The company launched QualysGuard in 2000, making Qualys one of the first entrants in the vulnerability management market. This software could automatically scan corporate LANs for vulnerabilities and search for an available patch. The company subsequently added compliance, malware detection, and web application scanning to its platform. 

Qualys went public on the Nasdaq under the stock ticker QLYS on September 28, 2012, raising net proceeds of $87.5 million.

Qualys then launched its Cloud Platform and lightweight cloud agent to continuously assess the security and compliance of organizations' global IT infrastructure and applications. The new Cloud Platform helped organizations assess and address the security and compliance of their IT assets in real-time, whether on-premises, cloud-based or mobile.

Products

Awards
Qualys won two Pwnie Awards in 2021, in the categories of "Best Privilege Escalation Bug" and "Most Under-Hyped Research".

Qualys honored by SC Media as the winner for Best Vulnerability Management Solution in its 2020 Trust Awards.

Qualys received 2019 Gartner Peer Insights Customers' Choice Award for Vulnerability Assessment.

In 2017 Frost & Sullivan recognized Qualys with 2017 Global Vulnerability Management Market Leadership Award.

Throughout its history Qualys has received a number of other awards.

References

External links
 
 
 Qualys SSL Labs Vulnerability Scanner
 
 
 
 

Companies based in Foster City, California
Software companies based in the San Francisco Bay Area
Computer security software companies
Software companies established in 1999
Companies listed on the Nasdaq
2012 initial public offerings
Software companies of the United States
1999 establishments in California